HMS Salisbury was a 50-gun fourth rate ship of the line of the Royal Navy, built at Chatham Dockyard to the dimensions of the 1706 Establishment, and launched on 3 July 1707. In autumn of 1707, she brought the body of admiral Sir Cloudesley Shovell (who had been killed in a disastrous shipwreck in the Isles of Scilly) from St Mary's to Plymouth prior to his burial in Westminster Abbey.

Salisbury was rebuilt for the first time by Stacey of Woolwich Dockyard. Unusually, as she was undergoing her rebuild just 10 years after her original launch, she was reconstructed to the same design specifications, and was relaunched on 10 October 1717. Salisbury was the only ship to have been built twice to the same design. She was ordered to be taken to pieces for her second rebuild in orders dated 9 April 1725, and was rebuilt at Portsmouth to the 1719 Establishment. Salisbury was relaunched on 30 October 1726.

Salisbury was engaged in an action during August 1711, attempting to intercept the homeward-bound Spanish plate fleet, which was expected to arrive at the port of Cartagena, Colombia from Portobelo. The Salisbury formed part of a group of five two-deckers and a sloop under Commodore James Littleton. The British fleet arrived on 6 August chasing five large vessels, but these were able to enter the harbour via the Bocachica entrance. The next morning, another four vessels were chased, and Captain Francis Hosier in the Salisbury, assisted by the Heureux, a French prize previously captured by the Salisbury, engaged the Spanish vice-flagship until Littleton could come up, and the Spaniard later submitted. A further Spanish vessel surrendered to Edward Vernon in the sixty-gun Jersey. The British continued to patrol the environs of  Cartagena until forced to abandon the blockade several weeks later, allowing the Spanish vessels to proceed to Havana unhindered.

Salisbury was converted to a hulk in 1744, and was sold out of the navy in 1749.

Notes

References

Lavery, Brian (2003) The Ship of the Line - Volume 1: The development of the battlefleet 1650-1850. Conway Maritime Press. .

Ships of the line of the Royal Navy
1700s ships